Shuko Aoyama and Aleksandra Krunić defeated Lesley Kerkhove and Bibiane Schoofs in the final, 7–5, 6–3, to win the women's doubles tennis title at the 2019 Rosmalen Grass Court Championships. 

Kerkhove and Schoofs had defeated defending champion Demi Schuurs in the semifinals, who partnered with Kiki Bertens in her title defense after Elise Mertens chose not to compete.

Seeds

Draw

Draw

References

Main Draw

Libéma Open - Doubles
2019 Women's Doubles